South Georgia Island has been explored and charted by various Antarctic expeditions. As a result, the island has an extensive number of notable named geographical features.

Bodies of water

Bays 

 Antarctic Bay
 Bjornstadt Bay
 Cheapman Bay
 Church Bay
 Cook Bay
 Cooper Bay
 Cumberland Bay
 Cumberland East Bay
 Cumberland West Bay
 Damien Bay
 Doris Bay
 Doubtful Bay
 Drygalski Fjord
 Elsehul
 Esbensen Bay
 Fortuna Bay
 Frida Hole
 Godthul
 Hamilton Bay
 Hercules Bay
 Hound Bay
 Ice Fjord
 Iris Bay
 Bay of Isles
 Jacobsen Bight
 Jason Harbour
 Jossac Bight
 Kelp Bay
 King Edward Cove
 King Haakon Bay
 Larsen Harbour
 Little Moltke Harbor
 Luisa Bay
 Queen Maud Bay
 Moraine Fjord
 Newark Bay
 Novosilski Bay
 Ocean Harbour
 Possession Bay
 Right Whale Bay
 Rocky Bay
 Rogged Bay
 Royal Bay
 Sacramento Bight
 Schlieper Bay
 St Andrews Bay
 Stromness Bay
 Tornquist Bay
 Trollhul
 Undine Harbour
 Undine South Harbour
 Wilson Harbour
 Windy Cove

Coves 

 Alert Cove
 Diaz Cove
 Elephant Cove
 Jumbo Cove
 Smaaland Cove

Glaciers 

 Austin Glacier
 Bary Glacier
 Bertrab Glacier
 Bogen Glacier
 Briggs Glacier
 Brøgger Glacier
 Brunonia Glacier
 Buxton Glacier
 Christensen Glacier
 Christophersen Glacier
 Clayton Glacier
 Cook Glacier
 Crean Glacier
 Dead End Glacier
 Eclipse Glacier
 Esmark Glacier
 Fortuna Glacier
 Geikie Glacier
 Graae Glacier
 Grace Glacier
 Hamberg Glacier
 Harker Glacier
 Harmer Glacier
 Heaney Glacier
 Helland Glacier
 Henningsen Glacier
 Herz Glacier
 Hindle Glacier
 Hodges Glacier
 Jenkins Glacier
 Jewell Glacier
 Keilhau Glacier
 Kjerulf Glacier
 König Glacier
 Lancing Glacier
 Lewald Glacier
 Lucas Glacier
 Lyell Glacier
 Morris Glacier
 Nachtigal Glacier
 Neumayer Glacier
 Nordenskjöld Glacier
 Novosilski Glacier
 Paget Glacier
 Peters Glacier
 Philippi Glacier
 Price Glacier
 Purvis Glacier
 Quensel Glacier
 Risting Glacier
 Ross Glacier
 Ryan Glacier
 Salomon Glacier
 Schrader Glacier
 Spenceley Glacier
 Storey Glacier
 Twitcher Glacier
 Tyrrell Glacier
 Webb Glacier
 Weddell Glacier
 Wheeler Glacier

Lakes 

 Gulbrandsen Lake
 Gull Lake
 Hamberg Lakes
 Lyell Lake
 Parochlus Lake

Landforms

Headlands 

 Cape Alexandra
 Antarctic Point
 Aspasia Point
 Aucellina Point
 Austin Head
 Barff Peninsula
 Begg Point
 Bjelland Point
 Cape Buller
 Busen Point
 Calf Head
 Chaplin Head
 Cape Charlotte
 Cape Constance
 Cape Darnley
 Cape Demidov
 Cape Disappointment
 Ducloz Head
 Factory Point
 Framnaes Point
 Gold Head
 Greene Peninsula
 Hansen Point
 Harbour Point
 Cape Harcourt
 Harrison Point
 Hercules Point
 Holmestrand
 Johnson Point
 Kade Point
 Kanin Point
 Kelp Point
 King Edward Point
 Klutschak Point
 Köppen Point
 Leon Head
 Low Rock Point
 Matthews Point
 Morse Point
 Müller Point
 Cape North
 Cape Nuñez
 Cape Paryadin
 Pig Point
 Pirner Point
 Point Purvis
 Restitution Point
 Romerof Head
 Cape Rosa
 Rumbolds Point
 Thatcher Peninsula
 Tønsberg Point
 Cape Vahsel
 Wales Head
 Weddell Point
 Will Point

Miscellaneous 

 Bonner Beach
 Hestesletten
 Papua Beach
 Salisbury Plain
 Sörling Valley
 Survey Isthmus

Mountains and hills 

 Admiralty Peak
 Allardyce Range
 Mount Antell
 Mount Ashley
 Atherton Peak
 Mount Back
 Mount Barren
 Mount Baume
 Best Peak
 Binary Peaks
 Binnie Peaks
 Blechnum Peaks
 Bomford Peak
 Brocken
 Mount Brooker
 Mount Burley
 Mount Carse
 Mount Clara
 Coffin Top
 Copestake Peak
 Mount Corneliussen
 Cornwall Peaks
 Coronda Peak
 Mount Cunningham
 Dixon Peak
 Mount Dow
 Ellerbeck Peak
 Mount Fagan
 Mount Fagerli
 Ferguson Peak
 Fortuna Peak
 Foxtail Peak
 Mount Fraser
 Fusilier Mountain
 Gazella Peak
 Mount Globus
 Mount Grant (South Georgia)
 Harper Peak
 Hay Peak
 Headland Peak
 Hesse Peak
 Jason Peak
 Justa Peak
 Mount Kling
 Mount Krokisius
 Larssen Peak
 Larvik Cone
 McIlroy Peak
 Mount Macklin
 Mount Mair
 Marikoppa
 Mills Peak
 Murphy Wall
 Nachtigal Peak
 Neighbour Peak
 Nordenskjöld Peak
 Mount Normann
 Orca Peak
 Mount Paget
 Mount Paterson
 Paulsen Peak
 Petrel Peak
 Pirner Peak
 Pyramid Peak
 Mount Regulator
 Roché Peak
 Mount Roots
 Ruby Peak
 Mount Sabatier
 Salvesen Range
 Mount Senderens
 Sheridan Peak
 Mount Skittle
 Slossarczyk Crag
 Smillie Peak
 Sørlle Buttress
 Mount Spaaman
 Stanley Peak, South Georgia
 Starbuck Peak
 Stejneger Peak
 Stenhouse Peak
 Mount Sugartop
 Swinhoe Peak
 Three Brothers
 Treble Peak
 Trendall Crag
 The Trident
 Vogel Peak
 Warburton Peak
 Wilckens Peaks
 Mount Woodward
 Mount Worsley

Rock formations 

 Andrews Rocks
 Anvil Stacks
 Bar Rocks
 Bucentaur Rock
 Camana Rock
 Contrast Rocks
 Cordall Stacks
 Discovery Rock
 Ems Rock
 Fantome Rock
 First Rock
 High Rock
 Middle Ground Rock
 Olsen Rock
 Seaward Rock
 Sky Rock
 Theodor Rock
 Waring Rocks

Landforms of South Georgia